In a Dream may refer to:

 "In a Dream" (song), by Rockell
 In a Dream, an album by American electronic musician The Juan MacLean.
 In a Dream (film), a 2008 documentary
 In a Dream (EP), a 2020 EP by Troye Sivan
 En rêve (Nocturne), a work by Franz Liszt (S.207) also referred to as "In a Dream"